Kuu may refer to:

  Kuu (Liberia) refers to a labor-sharing arrangement in the West African country of Liberia
 Kuu (Finland) refers to the moon goddess in Finnish mythology